1920 is a series of Indian horror films. The story is written by Vikram Bhatt, for all three films in the series. The first film released in 2008 is directed by Vikram Bhatt, the second film released in 2012 is directed by Bhushan Patel and the third film directed by Tinu Suresh Desai released in 2016. The first two films were commercially successful at the box office, while the third film did moderately well. In 2018, a spin-off film called 1921 was released. This was the first film in a new franchise by creator Vikram Bhatt.

Films

1920 (2008)

After forsaking his family and Hinduism, a husband finds his wife is demoniacally possessed.

1920: Evil Returns (2012)

A famous poet who meets a woman who is in trouble. In order to treat her, he takes her to Shimla in a big hospital, but soon that woman gets possessed by devil.

1920 London (2016)

After her husband is possessed by an evil spirit, a woman turns to her former lover to perform an exorcism.

1921 (2018)

In 1920s England, a pianist enlists the help of a ghost whisperer to cleanse the unclean spirit that is haunting him.

1920 – Horrors of The Heart (2023)

The fifth film is announced by the makers. The film will be directed by Krishna Bhatt, written by Mahesh Bhatt and produced by Vikram Bhatt. The film stars "Balika Vadhu" fame Avika Gor and Randheer Rai.

Cast

1920
 Rajneesh Duggal as Arjun Singh Rathod 
 Adah Sharma as Lisa Singh Rathod, reincarnated version of Gayatri
 Anjori Alagh as Gayatri 
 Indraneil Sengupta as Sipahi Mohan Kant 
 Raj Zutshi as Father Thomas 
 Sri Vallabh Vyas as the Doctor  
 Vipin Sharma as the caretaker of the haveli (manor house) i.e. haunted palace
 Asha Sharma as Radha Maa
 Rakhi Sawant, special appearance in the item song "Bichua"

1920: Evil Returns
 Aftab Shivdasani as Jaidev Verma 
 Tia Bajpai as Smriti/ Sangeeta 
 Sharad Kelkar as Amar (Evil Spirit) 
 Vidya Malvade as Karuna 
 Vicky Ahuja as Bankimlal

1920 London
 Sharman Joshi as Jai Singh Gujjar 
 Meera Chopra as Shivangi 
 Vishal Karwal as Veer singh
 Gajendra Chauhan as Tantrik 
 Meenal Kapoor as Witch 
 Sushmita Mukherjee as Kesar Maa

1921
 Karan Kundra as Ayush
 Zareen Khan as Rose
 Vikram Bhatt as Mr. Wadia

Crew

Release and revenue

References

Film series introduced in 2008
Indian film series
Horror film series
Tetralogies